, provisionally known as , is a resonant trans-Neptunian object from the outermost regions of the Solar System, approximately 154 kilometers in diameter. It discovered on 20 December 2001, by American astronomers Chad Trujillo, Glenn Smith and Michael E. Brown at the Palomar Observatory in California.

Orbit and rotation 

 is classified as a plutino. Its orbit has a semi-major axis of 42.396 AU and an orbital period of about 249 years. Perihelion leads to 27.881 AU from the Sun and its aphelion in the distance of 51.348 AU.

References

Sources 
 NASA.gov
 IAU  Minor Planet Center

External links
 
 

126155
Discoveries by Michael E. Brown
Discoveries by Chad Trujillo
20011220